beIN Series  is a set of television networks launched on 1 November 2016, owned by beIN Media Group and broadcast on beIN direct-broadcast satellite services in the MENA region, and in Turkey through the Digiturk system, which beIN purchased in 2015 and rebranded as beIN Series on 13 January 2016. The networks feature mainly one-hour drama and dramedy series.

The networks of beIN Series license content from American production companies, including ABC Studios, Warner Bros. Television and Sony Pictures Television. Series on the network are dubbed or subtitled with Arabic or Turkish, depending on the region.

History
In 2016, the company had launched children channel called CBeebies and ion July of the same year had signed a deal with the AMC Networks International to broadcast The Terror, The Night Manager and Fear of the Walking Dead.

In 2017, beIN Series had signed a contract with CBS Studios International and The CW which will allow the company to air such series as MacGyver and Bull, while CBS All-Access will provide beIN with The Good Fight and The Late Late Show with James Corden. The same year, the company had signed a deal with Eccho Rights to air New Bride, Winter Sun and Heart of the City on its beIN Drama HD1 channel.

In 2018, the channel had partnered with BBC Studios to broadcast BBC Earth and kiddie channel CBeebies through Digiturk.

References

Television networks in Qatar